Unmun-sa is a Buddhist temple located on the southernmost part of the Taebaek Mountains in Gyeongsangbuk-do, South Korea. It was built in the 21st year of the reign of King Jinheung (AD 560) . Around the end of the Silla Kingdom, the temple was expanded and renamed as Taejakgap-sa ("Great Magpie Hillside Temple"), but its name was changed to its current Unmansa ("Cloud Gate Temple") in the 20th year of the reign of King Taejo (AD 937). Parts of the temple were destroyed down during the invasion of the Korean peninsula (1592–98) by the Japanese general Toyotomi Hideyoshi.

Unmunsa is a temple of the Jogye Order. In 1950, it became the largest training center for nuns (kor. biguni) in South Korea.

Gallery

See also
Unmunsan

References

External links 
 Website of the Unmun-sa Temple (Korean)
 Unmun-sa, Unmun Temple (video)

Literature 
 Martine Batchelor, Sŏnʼgyŏng (Sŭnim), Women in Korean Zen, Lives And Practices. Syracuse University Press, 2006.

Cheongdo County
Buddhist temples in South Korea
Buddhist temples of the Jogye Order
Buildings and structures in North Gyeongsang Province